Xenosaurus manipulus is a lizard found in Mexico.

References

Xenosauridae
Reptiles described in 2022
Reptiles of Mexico